Plagiopus may refer to:
 Plagiopus (copepod), a genus of copepods in the family Aetideidae
 Plagiopus (plant), a genus of mosses in the family Bartramiaceae